Hallie Haglund (born September 5, 1982) is an American comedian, Emmy-winning writer, and producer. She is currently head writer and executive producer on Wyatt Cenac's Problem Areas.

Career 
Haglund worked as an NBC Studios page in Los Angeles while studying improv comedy at the Upright Citizens Brigade's L.A. theater.

She joined The Daily Show as a writers' assistant in 2006, and served as a staff writer from 2010–2017, making her the longest-serving female writer on the show. During her time writing for The Daily Show, Haglund won three Primetime Emmy awards. She is a contributor to the 2010 humor book Earth (The Book), written by Jon Stewart and other writers of The Daily Show.

Haglund has appeared several times as a guest on movie podcast The Flop House, which has led to her inclusion in the "Quotes of the Week" section of The A.V. Club column Podmass.

References

External links 
 

Articles by Hallie Haglund at The Hairpin

Living people
21st-century American comedians
American comedy writers
1982 births